Chedra pensor is a tiny dwarf moth in the family Batrachedridae. It has been found in the US states of California, Arizona and Illinois. The holotype is kept at the Department of Entomology of the National Museum of Natural History, Smithsonian Institution. It is the type species of the genus Chedra.

References

Batrachedridae
Moths described in 1966
Endemic fauna of the United States